KLM is a Dutch airline.

KLM may also refer to:
 4 KLM, a village in Sri Ganganagar district, Rajasthan, India
 Kalaleh Airport in Kalaleh, Iran (IATA code)
 Dutch Open (formerly KLM Open), a golf tournament
 Kollam KSRTC Bus Station (code: KLM), Kerala, India
 Karachi–Lahore Motorway, Pakistan, completion date March 2018
 Kerr-lens modelocking, a method of modelocking lasers
 Keystroke-level model, a form of human–computer interaction
 Loadable kernel module, of various computer operating systems
 Kilmaurs railway station, East Ayrshire, Scotland, station code
 KLM protocol
 Royal Museum of the Armed Forces and Military History (abbreviated KLM in Dutch), Brussels, Belgium

People:
 KLM comedy trio, Norwegian comedians Trond Kirkvaag, Knut Lystad, and Lars Mjøen
 KLM Line, Russian ice hockey trio, Vladimir Krutov, Igor Larionov, and Sergei Makarov
 Signature of sculptor Kurt Laurenz Metzler

klm may refer to:
 Kilolumen, see orders of magnitude (luminous flux)
 Kolom language (ISO 639 code: klm), a language of Papua New Guinea

See also 
 Kalem Company, an early American film studio